Ron Rodecker (March 4, 1930 – January 25, 2021) was an American educator, artist, and creator of Dragon Tales, a PBS and Canadian Broadcasting Corporation series about children who visit a world populated by friendly dragons.

Dragon Tales
Rodecker came up with the idea of Dragon Tales when solicited by Columbia TriStar to find a vehicle for his whimsical characters they witnessed at the Sawdust Summer Arts and Crafts Show in Laguna Beach, California.  He created a treatment for a prospective new series and both Columbia TriStar and Sesame Workshop  went in as partners to launch the series that aired on PBS and CBC and garnered three Emmy nominations.

Personal life
Rodecker was an educator for 23 years and served for two years as an elementary school principal on Kwajalein Atoll in the Marshall Islands. Rodecker lived in Nevada City, California with his wife Katherine.

Rodecker was a frequent artist and vendor at the Sawdust Festival in Laguna Beach, known for his watercolor paintings of nature and dragons. It was at the Sawdust Festival where he was noticed by Columbia TriStar, leading to him creating Dragon Tales. One of his art inspirations was a book titled "Encyclopedia of Legendary Creatures", which inspired him to start making illustrations in watercolor rather than in black and white.

Death
He died on January 25, 2021, at the age of 90 after a long battle with heart disease, his death was confirmed by his daughter on Facebook. He is survived by his wife Katherine, 4 daughters Cherie, Erin, Lauren and Gretchen, and 9 Grandchildren Lindsay, Josh, Mariah, Andrew, Spencer, Tristin, Griffin, Charlotte and Tessa.

References

External links
 

1930 births
2021 deaths
People from Long Beach, California